Stuart Parker was the defending champion but lost in the qualifying competition to Giovanni Fonio.

Dennis Novak won the title after defeating Wu Tung-lin 6–4, 6–4 in the final.

Seeds

Draw

Finals

Top half

Bottom half

References

External links
Main draw
Qualifying draw

Nonthaburi Challenger - 1